Leo Braudy may refer to: 

Leo Braudy (art dealer) (born 1993), American art advisor and dealer 
Leo Braudy (academic) (born 1941), American professor of English at the University of Southern California